The 1978 UCI Road World Championships took place on 27 August 1978 in Nürburg, West Germany.

Results

Medal table

External links 

 Men's results
 Women's results
  Results at sportpro.it

 
UCI Road World Championships by year
1978
1978 in road cycling
Uci Road World Championships, 1978